Samrukia is a genus of large Cretaceous pterosaurs known only from a single lower jaw discovered in Kazakhstan. The holotype and only known specimen was collected from the Santonian-Campanian age Bostobynskaya Formation in Kyzylorda District. It was described by Darren Naish, Gareth Dyke, Andrea Cau, François Escuillié, and Pascal Godefroit in 2012, and the type species is named Samrukia nessovi. The species is named after Lev Nessov, a paleontologist, and the genus is named after Samruk, a magical bird of Kazakh folklore.

Classification
The type specimen of Samrukia was at first believed to belong to an oviraptorosaurian theropod dinosaur. An initial cladistic analysis by Naish et al. found Samrukia nessovi instead to be a basal member of the bird lineage Ornithuromorpha.

A subsequent analysis published by Eric Buffetaut in 2011 challenged the interpretation of Samrukia nessovi as a bird. Buffetaut challenged the identification of certain "avian" characteristics identified by Naish et al., claiming that none were definitely avian and that many were in fact well known among pterosaurs. He noted that all purported autapomorphies of Samrukia, the unique traits used to set it apart from other birds, are shared with pterosaurs. He also criticized the earlier cladistic analysis for not including pterosaurs, but only birds and other theropod dinosaurs. Buffetaut stated that the species is "clearly a large pterosaur, not a giant bird."

One of the original researchers who described Samrukia, Darren Naish, agreed with Buffetaut's re-assessment. Naish wrote on his Scientific American Web log Tetrapod Zoology: "Working on fragmentary material is dangerous since you can often get things very, very wrong, and I realised within a few days of the paper appearing that Samrukia was no bird. It seemed, in fact, to be a pterosaur."

References

Late Cretaceous pterosaurs of Asia
Pterodactyloids
Fossil taxa described in 2012
Fossils of Kazakhstan
Taxa named by Darren Naish